Gaston Renondeau (10 September 1879 – 25 November 1967) was a French translator and writer. He was also a French military officer, reaching the rank of division general in 1936.

Biography

Military career 
Gaston-Ernest Renondeau entered the École Polytechnique before entering the military career as an artillery officer. In 1920, he served as the French military attache to the French mission in Japan. He obtained the rank of captain, and became brigadier general in 1932; division general in 1936. He was assigned as the French military attaché in Berlin from 1932 to 1938. This was considered the most important and prestigious of the  attache posts. His accounts during this period included reports detailing Adolf Hitler's preparations to build the largest military force in Europe to achieve German hegemony in the region. This included evidence sent to France that Germany was making arrangements for a long military conflict.

Translation career 
Trainee in the Japanese army, from 1909 to 1913, and military attaché in Tokyo from 1923 to 1928, Gaston Renondeau became familiar with the Japanese language and undertook the translation of classic texts, poetic anthologies and Noh plays from 1926.

His translations of Japanese literature are authoritative. However, his habit of signing only "G. Renondeau" sometimes made him rename "Georges" in some articles devoted to him.

Works

General works and anthologies 
 Gaston Renondeau, Histoire des moines guerriers au Japon, 1957, PUF,
 Gaston Renondeau, La doctrine de Nichiren, 1953, PUF,
 Gaston Renondeau, Nô, Premier et deuxième fascicules, 1953, Maison Franco-japonaise

Collective work 
 Gaston Renondeau, L'influence bouddhique sur les Nô, in Les Théâtres d'Asie, Éditions du Centre national de la recherche scientifique, 1961

Translations 
 Osamu Dazai: La déchéance d'un homme
 ,
 
 Yukio Mishima: The Sailor Who Fell from Grace with the Sea, Paris, Gallimard, series. "Folio, le livre de poche", 1979

References

External links 
  Introduction to Gaston Renondeau

1879 births
1967 deaths
École Polytechnique alumni
French translators
20th-century French writers